Paddy Healy was an Irish hurler. His championship career with the Cork senior team lasted just one season in 1919.

Healy was added to the Cork senior panel for the 1919 championship. It was a successful season for the team, with Healy winning his sole All-Ireland medal that year. He also won one Munster medal.

Honours

Cork
All-Ireland Senior Hurling Championship (1): 1919
Munster Senior Hurling Championship (1): 1919

References

St Mary's (Shandon) hurlers
Cork inter-county hurlers
Year of birth missing
Year of death missing